The 2015 Southern Conference football season was the 94th season of college football for the Southern Conference (SoCon) and formed a part of the 2015 NCAA Division I FCS football season.

Head coaches

Russ Huesman, Chattanooga – 7th year
Mike Houston, The Citadel – 2nd year
Bruce Fowler, Furman – 5th year
Bobby Lamb, Mercer – 3rd year

Chris Hatcher, Samford – 1st year
Scott Wachenheim, VMI – 1st year
Mark Speir, Western Carolina – 4th year
Mike Ayers, Wofford – 28th year

Preseason poll results
First place votes in parentheses

Preseason All-Conference Teams
Offensive Player of the Year: Jacob Huesman, Sr., QB (Chattanooga)
Defensive Player of the Year: Michael Pierce, Sr., DL (Samford)

Rankings

Regular season

All times Eastern time.

Rankings reflect that of the Sports Network poll for that week.

Week One

Players of the week:

Week Two

Players of the week:

Week Three

Players of the week:

Week Four

Players of the week:

Week Five

Players of the week:

Week Six

Players of the week:

Week Seven

Players of the week:

Week Eight

Players of the week:

Week Nine

Players of the week:

Week Ten

Players of the week:

Week Eleven

Players of the week:

Week Twelve

Players of the week:

Week Thirteen

Week Fourteen

Records against other conferences

FCS conferences

FBS conferences

Attendance

References